Guarapuava is a municipality in the state of Paraná in Brazil. It is the largest municipality in that state by area. Considered a regional development hub with a strong influence on neighboring municipalities, it is also part of a railroad junction of national importance called the Mercosur corridor, between the municipalities of Foz do Iguaçu and Curitiba. It is the richest agribusiness municipality in the state of Paraná.

Guarapuava is located at 25°23'36" south and 51°27'19" west. The region is known as the centre of the state of Paraná, in the third plateau, also called the Plateau of Guarapuava. Discovered by the Portuguese in 1770, and founded in 1810, the city's name comes from tupi guarani, meaning place of Maned wolves sound (Maned wolves are called Lobos-guará in portuguese).  Its elevation is 1120 m (3675 ft).

The first families to settle in the city were formed through the Tropeiros. These families had their roots in Poland, Italy and Germany. The city's birthday is celebrated on December 9, due to the beginning of colonisation between Rio Coutinho and Rio Jordão, in the goodwill of Nossa Senhora de Belém in 1819.

The city is the seat of the Roman Catholic Diocese of Guarapuava.

History

Discovered by the Portuguese in 1770 and founded in 1810, the city name derives from the Língua Geral of São Paulo agûarápuaba, meaning "place of Maned wolves sound" (gûará, Maned wolf + pu, sound/noise + aba, place). The city has the commemorative date of the anniversary date of December 9, due to the onset of colonization between Rio Coutinho and the Rio Jordão in the parish of Our Lady of Bethlehem in 1819, with the demarcation of village and church.

This location was chosen to start because of colonization at the time had a predilection to take up the field, with broad horizons, that through this natural feature, offering ease of defense against the Indians.

The first villages started up near Jaguariaíva, Pirai, Furnas, Castro, and Iapó Pouso of Ponta Grossa. Cities formed along the long path south until you come near the region where it is today the City of Guarapuava.

Its urban area has important role in its initial phase of Chagas Father Francisco Lima, who has started the occupation, based on some criteria of aesthetics, looking for the requirements contained in the charter of April 1, 1809, Count of Linhares, already determined that the standards to be followed by the buildings to be built. As for the point-core refers to Cathedral of Our Lady of Bethlehem, located at the top of the River Basin Cascavel, which was an important reference point for society of the time. The first mayor of Guarapuava was Colonel Pedro Lustosa de Siqueira.

In the year 1852, on July 17, the town of Our Lady of Bethlehem, was elevated to the category of town. On May 2, 1859 the district was created in Guarapuava, and José Antônio Araújo Vasconcelos of the first court of law. The Town of Our Lady of Bethlehem received annual city on April 12, 1871, by Law No. 271. Being separated from the municipality of Castro.

Economy

The agricultural sector represents approximately 18% of the composition of GDP. The council has strong participation in agricultural production in the state. It is one of the largest producers of Maris Piper potato in Brazil and also a major producer of corn, soybeans and barley. The industry has 35% share of the GDP, and the timber industry is the industrial activity that employs the most. Manufacture of paper and cardboard, beverage, chemical byproducts, and agro-food industry also has strong participation. The service sector is growing gradually and now includes about 47% of Guarapuava GDP.

Education
In 2006, there were 68 state-run schools.
Guarapuava has two public universities, the "Universidade Estadual do Centro-Oeste" and "Universidade Tecnologica Federal do Paraná" and three private colleges, "Faculdade Guarapuava", "Centro Universitário Campo Real" and "Faculdade Guairacá".

Twin town

Through Municipal Law 14/1988, Guarapuava has been declarared Twin Town, or Cidade Irmã with Rastatt, a city in Germany.

Transportation

The city is served by Tancredo Thomas de Farias Airport.

Geography

Altitude:     1.200 m over the ocean level
Area:         3.115,329 km2
Distance to Paranaguá: 361 km
Distance to Curitiba: 258 km

Climate

In summer the climate is pleasant, the highest temperature registered is 33 °C in February 1984, and the lowest is -6,8 °C in December 1982; the precipitations are formed principally by the warmth associated to humidity. In Winter the temperatures in some days are below 0 °C.

Winter

The altitude, ranging between 1000m and 1200m, combined with the latitude of 25 ° ensures a mild climate for Guarapuava most of the year. In winter there may be very cold days, the temperature may fall below the freezing point, often with frost and even snow, which guarantees the condition of the city one of the coldest cities in Brazil. The lowest temperature officially recorded in accordance with the INMET was -10.0 °C on 18 July 1975 record in the meteorological history of the city.

Note: In the same month (julho/1975) according to INMET, the temperature reached -3.8 °C on day 6, -4.0 °C on day 7, -4.2 °C on day 17, -- 6.0 °C on day 19 and -1.2 °C on day 20. The mean minimum temperature this month was only 3.1 °C.

Registration of snow in the city are common, with occurrence of intense rainfall in certain years.

Snow in Guarapuava (1950–2013), according to INMET:

 July 4, 1953
 July 30, 1955
 July 20, 1957
 19, 20 and 21 August 1965
 July 8, 1972
 17 July 1975
 August 25, 1984
 9 July 1994
 July 12, 2000
 July 22–23, 2013

Summer

The summer is mild, and the common temperature is below 15 °C with exceptional records of up to 6.8 °C in December 1982 and 7.8 °C in February 1990. But as is characteristic of summer in much of the country, the temperature can rise from 30 °C, reaching up to 33.6 °C, absolute record registered in February 1984. In summer the rains are formed mainly by the heat associated with moisture, with the temporal order in the afternoon, sometimes with the cold fronts, dry with occasional rains from June to August.

Statistics

In 2020 there were 182,644 inhabitants in Guarapuava, according to the Brazilian Institute of Geography and Statistics.

Tourism

The main sights of Guarapuava are: the Cathedral of Our Lady of Bethlehem, the Province of Entre Rios District, the Lake of Tears, the Park Lake, the Museum Entomological Hipólito Schneider, along with the Museum of Natural Science's collection of prof. João José Bigarella the Municipal Museum of Viscount Guarapuava the Jordan Recreation Park, the Municipal Park of Araucárias the San Francisco Municipal Park of Hope (Salto San Francisco), the Salto Curucacas the square of the Faith, the Teal Indian Reservation, the Teal and jump to Schoenstatt Shrine.

The city held a cultural event called Cavalhadas of Guarapuava. The folklore of Cavalhadas remained alive in Guarapuava, and the participation of more than a thousand amateur actors from all social strata and age groups in the municipality. Several dramatisations were incorporated to the event, which has size of party themes, including food, games, dances, medieval circus, with the interaction of princes, sultans and medieval knights. Since 2003 is not performed.

Sports
Guarapuava has high-level athletes, including national emphasis on sport as Shooting, cycling, football and kickboxing. It also has significant stakes in state championships. In 2006, the Gymnasium Hall Mayor Joaquim Prestes was totally reformed and adapted to international standards, thus becoming an example for other cities of Paraná and Brazil. This reform was possible to receive various sporting events, which previously were restricted to gyms with less public and less ability to structure for athletes.

Football

Associação Atlética Batel, based in Batel neighborhood, is the city's football club. They competed twice in the Série C. Estádio Waldomiro Gelinski hosts the club's home games.

Futsal

The city has a representative in the Gold Cup of Futsal, the Deportivo Cellutel Tim. This championship is conducted with teams from the elite futsal paranaense. Last year the team was eliminated in the first phase. The team has a nice gym, Gym Municipal Mayor Joaquim Prestes, with more than 2,000 seats, all with chairs. The city also has a women's futsal team, which was the champion of Paranaense futsal in 2008.

Rugby

Among the various sports practiced in the city highlight the growing number of supporters of rugby. Guarapuava was the only municipality in the state that have reached, while three teams of the sport: Lobo Bravo Rugby, Guarapuava Rugby and Minotaurs Rugby Club (the two past already extinct).

Since the year 2006, the city hosted several friendly matches between local teams and teams from Curitiba, Cascavel, Londrina, Ponta Grossa and Ciudad del Este, and also promoted, in 2006, three major competitions:

1st. Step of First Rugby Championship of the state of Paraná - (rugby union);
1st. Tournament of Independence (Rugby Sevens);
1st. Guarapuava Cup of Rugby Seven-a-side, the last two with the participation of over one hundred athletes, not just Guarapuava, but also of Cascavel and Ponta Grossa.

Since its first edition, and traditionally, Guarapuava has hosted the 1st. Stage of the Rugby Championship of the state of Paraná. That tournament, growing every year, currently has the participation, besides the local team, the teams of Curitiba, Cascavel, Londrina, Ponta Grossa, Maringá and Cidade Gaúcha.

Kickboxing

Celio Rodrigues is one of the most successful athletes in the country category. Participated in several international events successfully representing your city. In May 2008 he won an international title in Croatia, and in 2009 won the world title in Guarapuava.

Shooting

Guarapuava has one of the most modern training center for shooting sports in the country. Rodrigo Bastos, a city native, won the silver medal at the 2003 Pan American Games.

Chess

In 1991 and 1995, Guarapuava hosted the U-18 and U-16 World Chess Championships. In 1991, the events were held at the headquarters of the Guaíra Country Clube, and the U-18 section was won by Vladimir Kramnik.

Notable people

 Marcelle Bittar
 Sergio Rossetti Morosini
 Valdir Cruz
 Larissa Manoela

References 

 
Populated places established in 1810